Tiffield Pocket Park is a 2.6 hectare Local Nature Reserve north of Tiffield in West Northamptonshire. It is leased by a private owner to Tiffield Parish Council and managed by The Tiffield Pocketeers.

This one kilometre long site is a footpath along a former railway line. The path is lined with trees and shrubs of blackthorn, hawthorn, crab-apple and ash, and a balancing pond next to the path has been restored, increasing biodiversity.

There is access from the playing field off Eastcote Road (sometimes shown as Gayton Road).

References

Local Nature Reserves in Northamptonshire
West Northamptonshire District